Víctor Claver Arocas (born 30 August 1988) is a Spanish professional basketball player for Valencia of the Spanish Liga ACB and the EuroLeague.

Professional career

Valencia (2006–2012)
Claver began his playing career with the youth teams of his school, Sagrado Corazón HH. Maristas de Valencia, in Spain. He made his professional debut with Valencia during the 2006–07 season. He played in Europe's second-tier level competition, the EuroCup, for the first time during the 2007–08 season, and won it in the 2009–10 season.

He also played in the European top-tier level, EuroLeague, during the 2010–11 season, and averaged 10.9 points and 4.9 rebounds, over 14 games.

Portland Trail Blazers (2012–2015)
Claver was drafted 22nd overall by the Portland Trail Blazers in the 2009 NBA draft. On 12 July 2012, Claver signed a three-year deal with the Trail Blazers. He was assigned to the NBA D-League's Idaho Stampede on 7 December 2012, and recalled on 9 December 2012. The following day, he made his first NBA start, scoring 4 points in 25 minutes with 5 rebounds and 2 assists. Claver was reassigned to the Idaho Stampede on 14 December 2012, and recalled on 16 December 2012.  He played 80 games for the Trail Blazers over the next three years.

On 19 February 2015, Claver was traded, along with Will Barton, Thomas Robinson and a lottery-protected 2016 first-round pick, to the Denver Nuggets in exchange for Arron Afflalo and Alonzo Gee. Three days later, he was waived by the Nuggets before playing in a game for them.

Khimki Moscow (2015)
On 1 March 2015, Claver signed with BC Khimki of Russia for the rest of the season. On 17 July 2015 Claver and Khimki parted ways.

Attempt to return to Spain
In August 2015, he had a deal with Baskonia, but Valencia using the right of first refusal, matched the offer, and kept his rights in Spain. Baskonia obviously was not eager to pay a buy out to Valencia, but the Spanish forward did not want to play in his old team. According to reports, he did not want to play in a team which in the next season was going to compete in the second-tier level EuroCup, which led to Claver signing with a team outside the Spanish borders.

Lokomotiv Kuban (2015–2016)
On 2 September 2015, the Russian team Lokomotiv Kuban announced a one-year deal with Claver for the 2015–16 season.

FC Barcelona (2016–2021)
On 20 July 2016, he signed a three-year deal with FC Barcelona Lassa, after his new team reached an agreement with Valencia for acquiring his rights. On 2 July 2019, he extended his contract with FC Barcelona through 2022. On 12 July 2021, Claver officially parted ways with the club after five years.

Return to Valencia (2021–present)
On 13 July 2021, he signed a three-year deal with Valencia and he plays again for his hometown Valencia.

National team career
He was on Spain's junior national teams that won bronze medals at the 2006 FIBA Europe Under-18 Championship, and at the 2008 FIBA Europe Under-20 Championship. He has also played with the Spain men's national basketball team. Spain's medal cache included: gold medals at the EuroBasket 2009, EuroBasket 2011 and at the EuroBasket 2015, and a bronze medal at the EuroBasket 2013.

He also played at the 2010 FIBA World Championship, the 2014 FIBA Basketball World Cup, at the 2012 Summer Olympics, where Spain won a silver medal, and at the 2016 Summer Olympics, where Spain won a bronze medal.

Career statistics

NBA

Regular season

|-
| style="text-align:left;"|
| style="text-align:left;"|Portland
| 49 || 16 || 16.6 || .392 || .287 || .467 || 2.4 || .9 || .5 || .2 || 3.8
|-
| style="text-align:left;"|
| style="text-align:left;"|Portland
| 21 || 0 || 8.8 || .405 || .167 || .909 || 1.9 || .6 || .1 || .1 || 2.2
|-
| style="text-align:left;"|
| style="text-align:left;"|Portland
| 10 || 0 || 7.6 || .450 || .545 || .000 || 2.0 || .1 || .1 || .1 || 2.4
|- class="sortbottom"
| style="text-align:center;" colspan="2"|Career
| 80 || 16 || 13.4 || .398 || .293 || .585 || 2.2 || .7 || .4 || .2 || 3.2

Playoffs

|-
| style="text-align:left;"|2014
| style="text-align:left;"|Portland
| 2 || 0 || 3.5 || .000 || .000 || .000 || 0.5 || .0 || .0 || .0 || .0

EuroLeague

|-
| style="text-align:left;"|2010–11
| style="text-align:left;"|Valencia
| 14 || 14 || 27.6 || .472 || .368 || .841 || 4.9 || 1.4 || 1.4 || .4 || 10.9 || 12.1
|-
| style="text-align:left;"|2015–16
| style="text-align:left;"|Lokomotiv
| 31 || 31 || 27.0 || .500 || .400 || .780 || 5.9 || 1.6 || .8 || .5 || 9.4 || 13.5
|-
| style="text-align:left;"|2016–17
| style="text-align:left;" rowspan=3 |Barcelona
| 27 || 19 || 22.0 || .459 || .377 || .778 || 4.4 || 1.3 || .9 || .3 || 6.0 || 8.4
|-
| style="text-align:left;"|2017–18
| 24 || 6 || 16.0 || .451 || .422 || .800 || 2.9 || 1.2 || .6 || .3 || 4.6 || 5.4
|-
| style="text-align:left;"|2018–19
| 35 || 25 || 21.2 || .476 || .339 || .821 || 3.2 || 1.0 || .6 || .4 || 5.3 || 7.5
|- class="sortbottom"
| style="text-align:center;" colspan="2"|Career
| 131 || 95 || 22.5 || .477 || .382 || .806 || 4.2 || 1.3 || .8 || .4 || 6.9 || 9.2

References

External links

 
 
 
 Víctor Claver at euroleague.net
 
 
 
 Víctor Claver at acb.com 
 

1988 births
Living people
2010 FIBA World Championship players
2014 FIBA Basketball World Cup players
2019 FIBA Basketball World Cup players
Basketball players at the 2012 Summer Olympics
Basketball players at the 2016 Summer Olympics
Basketball players at the 2020 Summer Olympics
BC Khimki players
FC Barcelona Bàsquet players
Idaho Stampede players
Liga ACB players
Medalists at the 2012 Summer Olympics
Medalists at the 2016 Summer Olympics
National Basketball Association players from Spain
Olympic basketball players of Spain
Olympic bronze medalists for Spain
Olympic medalists in basketball
Olympic silver medalists for Spain
PBC Lokomotiv-Kuban players
Portland Trail Blazers draft picks
Portland Trail Blazers players
Power forwards (basketball)
Small forwards
Spanish expatriate basketball people in Russia
Spanish expatriate basketball people in the United States
Spanish men's basketball players
Sportspeople from Valencia
Valencia Basket players
FIBA Basketball World Cup-winning players